Efe Murad is a Turkish poet, translator, and historian.

Biography
Born and raised in Istanbul, Turkey, Efe Murad studied philosophy at Princeton University and completed his PhD in Ottoman History and Arabic Philosophy at Harvard University. Together with Cem Kurtuluş, he wrote the Matter-Poetry Manifesto in 2004. He is the author of six books of poetry and the translator of seven more, including the first complete translation of Ezra Pound’s Cantos into Turkish; volumes by the American poets Susan Howe, Lyn Hejinian, and C. K. Williams, the German author Thomas Bernhard, as well as the Iranian poets Mahmoud Mosharraf Azad Tehrani and Fereydoon Moshiri. Together with the American poet and translator Sidney Wade, he co-translated a collection of poems by the Turkish modernist Melih Cevdet Anday under the title Silent Stones (Talisman Press, 2017), which was awarded "the Meral Divitçi Prize for Turkish Poetry in Translation." His poems, writings and translations in English have appeared in a wide range of journals including The American Reader, Five Points, Denver Quarterly, Guernica, Critical Flame, Turkish Poetry Today, Poet Lore, Asymptote, Jacket2, and Two Lines, and exhibitions including the 13th Istanbul Biennial. In 2021, he published a volume of memoristic essay, The Pleasures of Empty Lots, which concerns the culture of flaneurship and the rise of authoritarianism in his hometown Istanbul. His bilingual book of poetry, Breaking of Symmetry/Simetrinin Kırılması, a collaboration with the Harvard University quantum physics researcher Dr. Sina Zeytinoğlu and poet-artist Sevinç Çalhanoğlu came out in a special edition of 400, funded by the European Union Grant Scheme for Common Cultural Heritage, as well as Turkey’s Aşina Project. According to the description included in the book, Murad recorded various conversations with Dr. Zeytinoğlu about his research on symmetry breakings and phase transitions. Having transcribed these recorded conversations, Murad chiseled Dr. Zeytinoğlu’s words into poetry by mixing them with corresponding contexts in Islamic philosophy and Sufism. A scholar of Ottoman history and Islamic philosophy, he is currently teaching history, religion, and writing at Wellesley College. His ongoing practice melds paleography, found footage, soundscapes, and mystical experience in poetry. An Organ of Quality, a cycle of poems will be published by Bored Wolves Press in 2023.

Books in English 
 The Pleasures of Empty Lots (Bored Wolves Press, 2021) .
 Silent Stones, co-trans. w/ Sidney Wade (Talisman House, 2017) .
 Breaking of Symmetry/Simetrinin Kırılması, in collaboration w/ Sina Zeytinoğlu, Sevinç Çalhanoğlu, and translator Fahri Öz (European Union Grant Scheme for Common Cultural Heritage, 2022) .

Poems in English Translation 
 "Encirclings" (trans. Murat Nemet-Nejat from "An Organ of Quality") published in an anthology of Mediterranean poets Circle Surface Sun: From Somewhere in the Mediterranean, eds. Irena Eden & Stijn Lernout (Schlebrügge.Editor, 2020) .

References

External links
 A survey of contemporary experimental poetry in Turkey "Visuality, Non-Agency, and Found Footage in heves: New Trends in Contemporary Turkish Poetry (2003-2010)" published by elit: Literaturhaus Europa 
 Poems in English in Jacket2,  Jacket 34 - October 2007 - Murat Nemet-Nejat: A Godless Sufism: Selections from «Eda: A Contemporary Anthology of 20th Century Turkish Poetry», Murat Nemet-Nejat, Ed.
 On "The Materialist Poem"in Jacket2 Jacket 34 - October 2007 - Murat Nemet-Nejat: A Godless Sufism: Essays on, including selected translations from, «Eda: «Eda: A Contemporary Anthology of 20th Century Turkish Poetry», Murat Nemet-Nejat, Ed.
"A poem in the manner of Karacaoglan", translations by Sidney Wade and  Efe Murad in Asymptote sections 1 and 4; sections 6-8 
 "Streets of Istanbul," a poetry performance along with Irina Baldini and Çağlar Köseoğlu, Winternachten Literature Festival in the Hague 2018 
 "Book of My Life," an interview at the Winternachten Literature Festival in the Hague 2018  
 "Fraternité! The Forgotten Value of Brotherhood," along with David Van Reybrouck and Fatma Aydemir, Winternachten Literature Festival in the Hague 2018 
"Voice", a translation by Sidney Wade and  Efe Murad in Guernica Voice 
 "Garip: A Turkish Poetry Manifesto", a translation by Sidney Wade and  Efe Murad in Critical Flame The Critical Flame
 A Word's Autobiography on Seyhan Erözçelik in Jacket2, A word's autobiography | Jacket2
 "Silent Stones: Selected Poems of Melih Cevdet Anday", Silent Stones: Selected Poems of Melih Cevdet Anday

1987 births
Writers from Istanbul
Turkish poets
21st-century poets
Living people
Princeton University alumni
Harvard University alumni
Wellesley College faculty